Li Dongyan is a former Chinese male curler.

As of 2010, he was employed for Chinese Curling Association as General Secretary.

As of October 2019, he is a special adviser to the World Curling Federation Board.

Teams

References

External links

Living people
Sportspeople from Harbin
Chinese male curlers
Place of birth missing (living people)
Year of birth missing (living people)